Allegan High School is a public high school in Allegan, Michigan.

Athletics
Allegan is a member of the Wolverine Conference.  The school mascot is the Tiger and the school colors are orange and black. The following MHSAA sanctioned sports are offered:

Baseball (boys)
Basketball (girls & boys)
Bowling (girls & boys)
Competitive cheerleading (girls)
Cross country (girls & boys)
Football (boys)
Golf (girls & boys)
Soccer (girls & boys)
Softball (girls)
Swim and dive (girls & boys)
Tennis (girls & boys)
Track and field (girls & boys)
Volleyball (girls)
Wrestling (boys)

Demographics
The demographic breakdown of the 712 students enrolled for the 2012–2013 school year was:

Male - 50.4%
Native American/Alaskan - 0.4%
Asian/Pacific islander - 0.7%
Black - 3.3%
Female - 49.6%
Hispanic - 3.9%
White - 91.6%
Multiracial - 0.1%

In addition, 38.5% of the students were eligible for free or reduced lunch.

References

External links
Allegan High School

Public high schools in Michigan
Schools in Allegan County, Michigan